The Seiwa Club (Purity and Harmony Club) was a political party in Japan.

History
The party was established in February 1918 as a breakaway by 28 Shinseikai members. In December 1918 it merged with a group of independent members of the National Diet to form an "Independent Group" that later became the Seikō Club.

References

Defunct political parties in Japan
Political parties established in 1918
1918 establishments in Japan
Political parties disestablished in 1918
1918 disestablishments in Japan